The Roman Catholic Diocese of Pankshin is a diocese located in the city of Pankshin in the Ecclesiastical province of Jos in Nigeria.

History
On March 18, 2014 the Diocese of Pankshin was established from territory of the Archdiocese of Jos and the Diocese of Shendam.

Ordinaries
Michael Gobal Gokum (consecrated 12 Jun 2014–present)

See also
Roman Catholicism in Nigeria

References

Pankshin
Christian organizations established in 2014
2014 establishments in Nigeria
Roman Catholic Ecclesiastical Province of Jos